Rabbi Doug is the host of the "TAPED WITH... RABBI DOUG" television show. It is locally produced in Chicago, Illinois (the mid-western United States). The show airs weekly on TV (with public funding) and airs on YouTube and on the TV show's website.

Biography
Rabbi Doug is rabbi of a congregation in Chicago, a chaplain, and he is also a school teacher. He is a frequent guest on a number of other television & radio shows, and Rabbi Doug writes a Torah column in the Chicago Jewish News. His TV show has been airing since 1996.

References

External links
 youtube link
 tvrabbi.com
 cantv.org

American television personalities
Living people
Year of birth missing (living people)